Federico Schianchi (Modena, October 6, 1858 - Rome, December 28, 1918) was an Italian painter, specializing in vedute in oil and water colors of Rome and Italian countryside.

Biography
He trained initially at the Modenese Institute of Fine Arts starting in 1878. There he was mentored by Antonio Simonazzi, who taught design, and the painter Ferdinando Manzini, who taught ornamentation. He moved to Rome in 1887.

References

1858 births
1918 deaths
19th-century Italian painters
Italian male painters
20th-century Italian painters
Painters from Modena
Italian vedutisti
19th-century Italian male artists
20th-century Italian male artists